Griseosphinx marchandi is a moth of the  family Sphingidae. It is known from Vietnam.

The length of the forewings is 36 mm. It is similar to Griseosphinx preechari but larger, and distinguishable by the continuous narrow white marginal line along the outer margin of the forewing upperside and the absence of black and white chequered fringes on both wings. The forewing upperside is also similar to Griseosphinx preechari but with a narrow white marginal line running along the outer margin, and a short whitish line.

References

Rhagastis
Moths described in 1996